This is a list of islands of the Turks and Caicos Islands. There are about 75 islands and land-tied islands in the Turks and Caicos Islands, including the following islands:

Bay Cay
Belle Isle
Big Ambergris Cay, 
Big Cameron Cay
Big Sand Cay
Bird Island (Pear Cay), 
Blue Hills Island
Booby Island
Breeches Island
Bush Cay
Conch Cay
Dellis Cay
Dikish Cay
Donna Cay
East Caicos, 
East Cay
Fish Cays
Five Cays
Fort George Cay
French Cay
Gibbs Cay
Grand Turk, 
Highas Cay
Hog Cay
Iguana Cay
Joe Grants Cay
Little Ambergris Cay, 
Little Water Cay
Long Cay
Major Hill Cay
Mangrove Cay, 
Middle Caicos, 
Middle Creek Cay
Middleton Cay
North Caicos, 
Parrot Cay, 
Pear Cay, 
Pelican Cay
Penniston Cay
Pine Cay
Plandon Cay
Providenciales Island, 
Sail Rock Island
Salt Cay, 
Sand Cay
Seal Cays
Shot Cay
Six Hill Cays
South Caicos, 
Stubb Cay
The Island
Three Mary Cays
Water Cay
West Caicos, 
West Sand Spit Island
White Cay

See also
 List of Caribbean islands

References

Caicos Islands
Turks and Caicos Islands